Pete Rodriguez (born August 2, 1969) plays jazz trumpet and is a composer, vocalist, and percussionist. 
The reviewer Brian Zimmerman, in a review of the El Conde Negro album, wrote in 2015 that "Rodriguez is not only an attentive student of the Latin jazz tradition, but also one of the talented young artists who will usher it into the future."

Biography
Raised in Bronx, New York. Rodriguez is a jazz trumpeter and vocalist who is now based in Austin, Texas. Son of salsa musician, Pete "El Conde" Rodriguez. He has performed with Celia Cruz and appears on the Tito Puente’s album Mambo Birdland, which won the Latin Grammy Award for Best Traditional Tropical Album in 2000. 
As a leader, his recent festival performances include the IX Festival De Jazz at the Conservatorio De Musica De Puerto Rico, and with his quintet, which included Luis Perdomo (pianist), drummer Rudy Royston, saxophonist Gil Del Bosque, and bassist Ricky Rodriguez, at the 2014 Festival de Jazz de Chihuahua.

Discography
1999 Mambo Birdland [RMM Records & Video]
2014 Caminado con Papi Destiny Records DR-0001
2015 El Conde Negro Destiny Records DR-0004

References

American jazz trumpeters
American male trumpeters
1969 births
American jazz percussionists
Living people
21st-century trumpeters
21st-century American male musicians
American male jazz musicians